Government Laboratory High School is a public school in Bangladesh. It was established on 1 January 1967.

References

High schools in Bangladesh
Schools in Comilla District